Segerstrom may refer to 
Segerström (surname)
C.J. Segerstrom & Sons, a real estate company in Orange County, California, U.S.
Segerstrom Center for the Arts, a performing arts complex in Costa Mesa, California, U.S.
Segerstrom High School in Santa Ana, California, U.S.